Renee Biautubu is a Fijian footballer. She has been a member of the Fiji women's national team.

References

Living people
Fijian women's footballers
Fiji women's international footballers
Year of birth missing (living people)
Women's association footballers not categorized by position